"In Every Dream Home a Heartache" is a song written by Bryan Ferry, originally appearing on his band Roxy Music's second album, For Your Pleasure.

Lyrically, the song is a sinister monologue, part critique of the emptiness of opulence, partly a love song to an inflatable doll. Musically this is complemented by a cycling four-bar chord progression,(D# F# F G#) led by a 'cinema organ' style Farfisa part. After the lyrical conclusion "I blew up your body/but you blew my mind!", the song climaxes with an extended instrumental section, with the lead taken by guitarist Phil Manzanera.

On the original vinyl LP, the song was the last one on side A, and appeared to fade out into the run-out groove, only to return, heavily processed with phase shifting techniques. This audio pun is preserved on the CD release.

The song is one of the most iconic and popular in the Roxy Music catalogue, having been performed by them, for instance, on the BBC Old Grey Whistle Test show, and regularly in live sets, as featured on Roxy Music's live albums Viva! and Concerto. The band's live performance on an edition of the German Beat Club shows Mackay playing the organ part, with Ferry on rhythm guitar. Eno replaces the studio phase-shifting process with tape delay techniques.

In 2019, the song was used in the television series Mindhunter. It was played over the cold open of Season 2/Episode 1 depicting American serial killer Dennis Rader. The song was also used in the film The Gentlemen when Raymond Smith (Charlie Hunnam) breaks into a council estate flat.

Musicians
 Andy MacKay: Farfisa organ, saxophone
 Bryan Ferry: vocals, rhythm guitar
 Brian Eno: VCS 3 synthesizer, tape effects
 Paul Thompson: Drums
 Phil Manzanera: Guitar
 John Porter: Bass

References

Roxy Music songs
Songs written by Bryan Ferry
1973 songs
Song recordings produced by Chris Thomas (record producer)
Song recordings produced by John Anthony (record producer)